Chilonis was a Spartan princess and queen: daughter, wife, sister and grandmother of four different Spartan kings: Leonidas II, Cleombrotus II, Cleomenes III and Agesipolis III respectively.

Biography
Chilonis, daughter of the king Leonidas II and his wife Cratesiclea, a woman of Persian origin, became Queen of Sparta in 272 BC, when the father was deposed from the throne by the ephor Lysander and substituted by her husband Cleombrotus II. In that circumstance, Chilonis preferred to follow her father in his exile, instead of remaining in Sparta with her husband, the new king.

The next year, when Lysander's duty as ephor had finished, Leonidas returned to Sparta and re-installed himself on the throne, with the intention of sentencing his son-in-law to death, but Chilonis prayed her father to commute the penalty to exile and Leonidas satisfied his daughter's wish.

At this point Chilonis, instead of remaining in Sparta, as her father was asking her to, preferred going to exile again, this time following her husband Cleombrotus, along with their two children.

Notes

References
Plutarch, Parallel Lives, Agis 
Pausanias, Description of Greece
Smith, William "Dictionary of Greek and Roman Antiquities edited",Little, Brown  Co, 1870
Sarah B. Pomeroy, Spartan Women, Oxford University Press, 2002

Spartan princesses
3rd-century BC Spartans
Ancient Spartan queens consort
Agiad dynasty
3rd-century BC Greek women